Jose Manuel de los Reyes González de Prada y Ulloa (Lima, January 5, 1844 – Lima, July 22, 1918) was a Peruvian politician and anarchist, literary critic and director of the National Library of Peru. He is well remembered as a social critic who helped develop Peruvian intellectual thought in the early twentieth century, as well as the academic style known as modernismo. He was close in spirit to Clorinda Matto de Turner whose first novel, Torn from the Nest approached political indigenismo, and to Mercedes Cabello de Carbonera, who like González Prada, practiced a positivism sui generis.

Early life and literary contributions 

He was born on January 5, 1844, in Lima to a wealthy, conservative, Spanish family. His father was the judge and politician Francisco González de Prada Marrón y Lombrera, who served as Member of the Superior Court of Justice of Lima and Mayor of Lima. His mother was María Josefa Álvarez de Ulloa y Rodríguez de la Rosa.

Due to the political exile of his father, the family settled down in Valpariso, where he started his education at an English school. Returned to Peru, his father was elected Mayor of Lima in 1857 and he continued his studies at the Seminary of Santo Toribio. Prada abandoned Santo Toribio and enrolled the liberal San Carlos Convictorium, where he studied law and letters.

He was an original partner in the Lima Literary Club and he participated in the foundation of the Peruvian Literary Circle, a vehicle to propose a Literature based on science and the future. His most famous book, Free Pages, caused a public outcry that brought González Prada dangerously close to excommunication from the Catholic Church. His mother, a devout Catholic, died in 1888 and his criticism became more vitriolic afterwards. He said the Church "preached the sermon on the mount and practiced the morals of Judas." In fact González Prada was part of a group of social reformers that included Ricardo Palma, Juana Manuela Gorriti, Clorinda Matto de Turner and Mercedes Cabello de Carbonera. These important authors were concerned with the enduring influence of Spanish colonialism in Peru. González Prada was perhaps the most radical of them all. The most radical work he published during his lifetime was Hours of Battle, translated as Hard Times.

Besides being a philosopher and a significant political agitator, González Prada is important as the first Latin American author to write in a style known as modernismo  (modernista in Spanish, different from Anglo-American modernism) poet in Peru, anticipating some of the literary innovations that Rubén Darío would shortly bring to the entire Hispanic world. He also introduced new devices such as the triolet, rondel and Malayan pantun which revitalized Spanish verse. Besides his poetry, he cultivated the essay, and most recently Isabelle Tauzin Castellanos has published some of his hitherto unknown fiction. His intellectual and stylistic footprint can be found in the writing of Clorinda Matto de Turner, Mercedes Cabello de Carbonera, José Santos Chocano, Aurora Cáceres, César Vallejo, José Carlos Mariátegui and Mario Vargas Llosa.

One of the most interesting literary personalities of Peru, and a bitter critic of the society in which he lived. An atheist, a follower of Darwin, Spencer, and Comte, Manuel González Prada was a powerful polemicist whose targets were the Catholic Church, the Spanish tradition, and, generally, any form of conservatism. His books Minúsculas (1901) and Exóticas (1911) are often considered as modernista although his work transcends the scope of that movement. Some critics have suggested that his
poetry is pre-proletarian. Baladas peruanas (1935), perhaps his best book, is a vindication of the Indian. His metrical and rhythmical innovations and experiments are remarkable in Spanish-American poetry. Horas de lucha (1908) is a good example of his prose.

Politics 

After Peru's defeat in the War of the Pacific, he stayed in house for three years, refusing to look at the foreign invaders. 
He had been a member of the Civilista Party but left to found with his friends, a radical party known as the National Union, a party of "propaganda and attack." This party named him as a presidential candidate, but he fled to Europe following persecution. He stood as his party's Presidential Candidate in the Presidential election of 1899 and came third with 0.95% of the vote. 
After his failure in the Presidential election he was asked to work for the newly formed government. He took up the post of director of the National Library of Peru, on Abancay Avenue and helped to improve and reorganise the library to one of international stature. He died of a cardiac arrest on July 22, 1918.

Although he didn't consider himself a Communist, Gonzalez Prada was close to Marx in economic theory. He opposed the Russian Revolution in 1917 and rejected the rigidity of the Communist party. More precisely he was close to Pierre-Joseph Proudhon and also to Bakunin and their brand of anarchism. He criticized the aristocratic class (of which he was a member) for its crimes and its wasting opportunity. Gonzalez Prada called on workers, students and Andean people to take over and reform Peru.

Quotes by Gonzalez Prada
On Peru:"We have never initiated a reform, never announced a scientific truth, nor produced an immortal book. We do not have men but mere echoes of men, we do not express ideas but repetitions of decrepit and moth-eaten phrases."

On Revolution: "Revolutions come from above but are carried out from below. Their way lighted by the gleam on the surface, those who are oppressed in the depths see justice clearly and thrust forward to conquer it, without hesitating as to the means nor feeling fear as to the consequences. While the moderates and theoreticians imagine geometric evolutions or get all tangled up in the details of form, the multitude simplifies matters, taking them down from the nebulous heights and confining them to earthly practice. They follow the example of Alexander; they do not untie but cut the knot which binds them."

On Liberty: believed "that all liberty was born bathed in blood...Rights and freedom are never granted; they must be taken. Those who command give only what they must, and nations which sleep trusting their rulers to arouse them with the gift of liberty are like fools who build a city in the midst of a desert hoping that a river will suddenly flow through its barren streets."

Anarquía
Anarquía (posthumous 1936)

References 

 González Prada, Manuel, Free Pages and Hard Times: Anarchist Musings. Oxford: Oxford University Press, 2003.
 González Prada, Manuel, "The Slaves of the Church". Trans. Cathleen Carris. PMLA 128.3 (May 2013): 765-777.

Secondary bibliography 

 Rufino Blanco Fombona, Grandes escritores de América, Madrid, 1917.
 Eugenio Chang-Rodríguez, La literatura política: De González Prada, Mariátegui y Haya de la Torre, Mexico, 1957, esp. pp. 51–125.
 John A. Crow, "The Epic of Latin America," Fourth Edition, pp. 636–639.
 Joël Delhom, "Ambiguités de la question raciale dans les essais de Manuel González Prada", en Les noirs et le discours identitaire latinoaméricain, Perpignan, 1997: 13-39.
 Efraín Kristal, Una visión urbana de los Andes: génesis y desarrollo del indigenismo en el Perú, 1848-1930, Lima, 1991.
 Robert G. Mead, Jr., Perspectivas interamericanas: literatura y libertad, New York, 1967, esp. pp. 103–184.
 Eduardo Muratta Bunsen, "El pensamiento filosofico de don Manuel González Prada," en Filosofía y sociedad en el Perú, Lima, 2003: 128-143.
 Luis Alberto Sánchez, Nuestras vidas son los ríos…historia y leyenda de los González Prada, Lima, 1977.
 Isabelle Tauzin-Castellanos, ed., Manuel González Prada: escritor de dos mundos, Lima,  2006.
 Marcel Velázquez Castro, Las máscaras de la representación: el sujeto esclavista y las rutas del racismo en el Perú (1775-1895), Lima, 2005, esp. pp. 249–264.
 Thomas Ward, La anarquía inmanentista de Manuel González Prada. New York, 1998.
 Thomas Ward, “González Prada: soñador indigenista de la nación”, en su Resistencia cultural: La nación en el ensayo de las Américas, Lima, 2004: 160-177.
 Thomas Ward, “Manuel González Prada vs. Rigoberta Menchú: When Indigenismo meets Indigenous Thought.” Hispania 95.3 (September 2012): 400-423.
 Thomas Ward, ed, El porvenir nos debe una Victoria. La insólita modernidad de Manuel González Prada. Lima, 2010.

External links 

  Manuel González Prada page. Daily Bleed's Anarchist Encyclopedia (English)
 Times of Struggle An ongoing translation project of Horas de lucha
 El porvenir nos debe una victoria, a new website dedicated to Manuel González Prada replacing "Ensayos y poesía"
 His most important collections of essays and poetry, archived from "Ensayos y poesía", Manuel González Prada 

1844 births
1918 deaths
People from Lima
Peruvian people of Spanish descent
Modernismo
Peruvian essayists
Peruvian male poets
Peruvian anarchists
National Union (Peru) politicians

Male essayists